The Davington Light Railway was a narrow gauge railway built to serve the armaments factories near Davington, in Kent, England. It ran between Davington and Uplees.

History
Munitions have been produced at Faversham since 1561. Three gunpowder factories had been established by 1786, though a serious explosion in 1847 put a temporary end to production. In 1873, the Cotton Powder Company built a factory to produce gun cotton on Uplees Marsh. In 1912, a second factory was built by the Explosives Loading Company, with a third by Eley Brothers Ltd. established nearby at Harty Ferry.

The outbreak of the First World War saw a massive increase in the need for munitions. The mills in the marshes near Faversham were a major production centre, sending their output by river barges to the Royal Arsenal at Woolwich. Hundreds of workers were travelling daily across the marshland from nearby villages and towns to work in the mills. 1916 was a particularly wet year, and these journeys became intolerable. In order to efficiently move workers to and from the factories, the Davington Light Railway was laid between Davington and between Uplees.

The carriages were all open sided, with curtains to keep the weather out. As well as the terminus stations, there was also a halt at Oare. Separate trains were provided for men and women, on account of the coarse language the men used.

Freight was also carried, including acid, coal, cotton, detonators, mines and shells. Four wagons from the Davington Light Railway were purchased by Colonel Stephens for use on the Rye and Camber Tramway.

The line closed at the end of World War I, and the line and its equipment were sold by auction. During World War II, the tunnel at Oare was used as an air raid shelter. The station sites at Davington and Uplees have been obliterated by development, but the route of the trackbed at Oare can be traced, and the tunnel under the road at Oare still exists.

Route 
The southern terminus of the railway was at Davington, where there was a station with goods yard and locomotive shed. The line headed northwards across the marshes. The line then entered the  Oare Tunnel, passing under a minor road. The line was climbing through the tunnel and continued to the low summit. From there it dropped down towards The Swale as it crossed Uplees Marches. The northern terminus of the passenger line was at Uplees Station.

Locomotives 

One of the locomotives is believed to be still in existence. Often quoted as works number 1916, the actual locomotive would appear to be works number 1915, carrying the worksplate of its sister.

Gauge
According to Taylor, the gauge was  but some other sources give . The exact gauge will probably never be known.

The Davington Light Railway was built to the gauge that was already in use at the explosives factories. The first locomotive there was a German-built Deutz petrol locomotive, delivered just before the start of World War I. Possibly this was of  gauge and the track was built to fit it.

References

Sources

See also
 British industrial narrow gauge railways
 British military narrow gauge railways
 Faversham explosives industry

Industrial railways in England
Metre gauge railways in England
Transport in Faversham
Buildings and structures in Faversham
 Railway lines opened in 1916
 Railway lines closed in 1919